Omar Surkhay ogly Popov (born 2 January 2003) is a Russian football player who plays for FC Krasnodar-2.

Club career
He made his debut in the Russian Football National League for FC Krasnodar-2 on 9 October 2021 in a game against FC Veles Moscow.

He made his Russian Premier League debut for FC Krasnodar on 7 March 2022 against FC Ural Yekaterinburg.

Career statistics

References

External links
 
 Profile by Russian Football National League
 

2003 births
People from Labinsk
Sportspeople from Krasnodar Krai
Living people
Russian footballers
Russia youth international footballers
Association football forwards
FC Krasnodar-2 players
FC Krasnodar players
Russian Second League players
Russian First League players
Russian Premier League players